The Rengam railway station is a Malaysian train station located at and named after the town of Renggam, Kluang District, Johor, Malaysia.

Similar to Kluang, passenger operations shifted to Rengam Temporary Railway Station which is constructed on a viaduct some miles away from future Rengam Station. This leaves old Rengam Station open only for passenger facilities. It is still unknown whether the tracks within old Rengam Station has been removed.

See also
 Rail transport in Malaysia

Kluang District
KTM ETS railway stations
Railway stations in Johor